Nong Waeng railway station is a railway station located in Phon Khwao Subdistrict, Mueang Sisaket District, Sisaket Province.

References 

Railway stations in Thailand
Sisaket province